Arbory is one of the seventeen historic parishes of the Isle of Man.

It is located in the south of the island (part of the traditional South Side division) in the sheading of Rushen.

Settlements in the parish include Ballabeg, Colby and Ronague.

Local government
For the purposes of local government, the whole of the historic parish forms an electoral ward of the parish district of Arbory and Malew.

The Captain of the Parish (since 1998) is Cecil Raymond Gawne.

Politics
The area of the historic parish is part of the Arbory, Castletown & Malew constituency, which elects two Members to the House of Keys. Until 2016 it was in the  Rushen constituency.

Demographics
The Isle of Man census of 2016 returned a parish population of 1,847, an increase of 5.4% from the figure of 1,747 in 2011.

References

External links
Arbory Parish Commissioners
 Manxnotebook Arbory Detail about Manx parishes and description of Arbory Parish. 
Manxnotebook - Arbory with full description of the parish and photographs 
 Arbory Parish Community and Local Government Arbory Commissioners, photographs, local clubs, societies and churches.
 Isle of Man Building Control Districts showing parish boundaries
 Manxnotebook Kirk Arbory Antiquities
 Qualtrough.org Family Genealogy with family details and photographs.
 Glenology - Manx Glens An ongoing study of Manx glens, their locations and meanings.

Parishes of the Isle of Man